Access America Transport was a third-party logistics provider of transportation and logistics services. The company, based in Chattanooga, Tennessee,  operated nine offices and serviced customers throughout North America. Access America's services included: truckload shipping, less than truckload shipping, intermodal, specialized transportation, and supply chain management. Access America Transport was one of the fastest growing transportation and logistics service provider in North America.

History
Access America Transport was founded in 2002 in Chattanooga by Ted Alling and Barry Large as the logistics division of Key-James Brick. The company soon expanded into other commodities and began offering dry van, flatbed, and refrigerated van service.

In 2003, Miller Welborn and Allan Davis joined Access America Transport and the company expanded its services to include transload and warehouse facilities. Access America opened its first such facility in Birmingham, Alabama.

The company opened its second office location in 2005 in Birmingham. The office began working with the Department of Defense and other government entities moving truckload freight within the United States. Following the opening of the Birmingham location, the company began moving freight within Canada and Mexico as well.

In 2006, Access America added locations in Minneapolis and Eufaula, Alabama. In addition, the company began offering less-than-truckload (LTL), heavy haul, and intermodal services to its customers. The expansion into LTL also included technology upgrades which enabled Access America customers to enter shipment information online and compare service options based on pricing, service, and LTL carrier, the interface similar to websites like Travelocity.

In 2007 and 2008, Access America opened three additional locations in Ohio and Tennessee. The company also expanded into supply chain management, reverse logistics, freight consolidation, and refrigerated LTL while further upgrading its transportation management system software. In 2009, the ownership team at Access America also founded a transportation insurance agency called Reliance Partners.

Access America Transport added its 7th location in Atlanta in June 2011. The company hired its 200th employee in July 2011 and expanded its Chattanooga and Minneapolis facilities. AAT opened two additional offices in 2012. The new offices locations were opened in Denver, Colorado and San Antonio, Texas. The San Antonio office was opened to provide additional focus on produce and refrigerated shipping. In addition, the Birmingham and Columbus, Ohio locations were both relocated to accommodate additional growth. Access America Transport hired its 425th employee in November 2012.

Access America Transport announced the addition of over 950 new jobs in Chattanooga; Knoxville; and Minneapolis in early 2013. These jobs are to be created over the next five years and will be supported by workforce training grants from Tennessee and Minnesota. 2013 also marked the opening on the tenth Access America office in the Gulf Coast region.

In March 2014, Access America Transport and Coyote Logistics announced that both boards had approved an agreement to merge the two businesses. The combination created a more than $2 billion freight brokerage. Coyote Logistics reportedly paid more than $260 million for Access America Transport. The combined company was sold to UPS for $1.8 billion in July 2015.

Services
 Truckload: Dry van shipments of freight 
 Less-Than-Truckload (LTL): Generally smaller shipments of cargo, less than 10,000 lb
 Intermodal (Rail): Shipments of freight via rail in containers or trailers 
 Temperature-Controlled: Reefer shipments (Refrigerated or frozen truckload) 
 Open Deck: Flatbed, specialized, permits, escorts, over-dimensional, or permitted loads 
 Supply Chain Management: Customizable supply chain solutions and reporting 
 Common, Contract, and Private fleets: Freight is matched with backhaul assets

Access America Transport works with customers in North America moving their freight via truck and rail. The company, acting as a third-party, negotiates pricing with its customers and negotiates volume pricing from trucking companies and railroads. The company has contracts and relationships with 46,000 truckload providers, 48 less-than-truckload providers, and 12 railroads. The carrier relationships encompass common, contract, and private fleet trucking companies.

The company’s customer base includes the United States Government, government contractors, manufacturers, distributors, and other logistics companies. Industries serviced by the company include: aerospace, automotive, chemical, construction materials, electronics, food and beverage, produce, retail, telecommunications, and textiles. The company is ISO 9001:2008 certified and is a member of the SmartWay Transport Partnership, a collaboration between the freight industry and the U.S. Environmental Protection Agency.

Awards and recognition
 Forbes America's #9 Most Promising Company - 2013 
 Inc. 500|5000
 ISO 9001:2008 Certified
 2011 Chattanooga Chamber of Commerce Business of the Year - Large Category
 Supply Chain Brain 100 Great Supply Chain Partners
 Most Engaged Workplaces
 Inbound Logistics Top 100 - 2009, 2010, 2011, 2012
 EPA SmartWay Transport Partnership
 Transport Topics Top 25 Freight Brokerage Firm
 BusinessTN Hot 100
 NASTC Best Broker
 TIA P3 Certification

References

External links
 Access America Transport
 Forbes America's Most Promising Companies
 Access America Transport Facebook
 Access America Transport LinkedIn
 Access America Transport Blog

Logistics companies of the United States
Companies based in Chattanooga, Tennessee
Transport companies established in 2002
2002 establishments in Tennessee
2014 mergers and acquisitions
Transportation companies based in Tennessee